Vasile Lupu Lyceum (former PS.38) (Romanian: Liceul Teoretic "Vasile Lupu") of Chişinău, Moldova is a public school. It is named after Vasile Lupu, Moldavian voivod.

External links 
Website of the Vasile Lupu Lyceum

Buildings and structures in Chișinău
Educational institutions with year of establishment missing
Schools in Moldova